John Nolan (born 1954 in New Ross, County Wexford) is an Irish retired sportsperson.  He played hurling with his local club Geraldine O'Hanrahan's and was a member of the Wexford senior inter-county team from 1975 until 1987.

References

1954 births
Living people
Date of birth missing (living people)
Geraldine O'Hanrahan's hurlers
Wexford inter-county hurlers
Leinster inter-provincial hurlers
Hurling goalkeepers